Diane Daniels Denish (born March 7, 1949) is an American politician, who was the 28th  lieutenant governor of New Mexico. She was elected in 2002, running on the same ticket as Governor Bill Richardson, and was re-elected in 2006. Denish is the first woman to hold that post.

There was early speculation that Denish would run in the 2008 election for the New Mexico Senate seat vacated by Pete Domenici, but she ruled out running. She ran for governor in 2010 and was defeated by Republican nominee Susana Martinez on November 2, 2010.

Personal life
Diane Denish was born March 7, 1949, in Hobbs, New Mexico. Her father, Jack Daniels, was a prominent New Mexico politician and the brother of Bill Daniels. She earned her BA from the University of New Mexico in 1971.  Prior to entering politics, she owned and operated The Target Group, a small business specializing in market research and fund-raising for nonprofit organizations. Denish enjoys cooking in her leisure time.

Political career
Denish has served as Chair of the New Mexico Democratic Party, as well as Chair of New Mexico First and Chair of the New Mexico Community Foundation.

Denish has been appointed by three New Mexico Governors to serve in numerous capacities, including as a member of the Board of Regents at New Mexico Tech University, as Chair of the New Mexico Commission on the Status of Women, and as a member of the National Advisory Board of the Small Business Administration under President Bill Clinton.  In 1998, she was the Lieutenant Governor candidate on the ticket with Martin Chavez, losing the race 54%-45% to then Governor Gary Johnson.

In her capacity as lieutenant governor, Denish has supported legislation to increase microlending funds and place tighter regulations on payday lenders. She also supported legislation to establish voluntary pre-kindergarten enrollment for all New Mexico four-year-olds and legislation to combat methamphetamine manufacturers and dealers who target children.

She serves as the President of the New Mexico Senate, chair of the Children's Cabinet, chair of the Mortgage Finance Authority, chair of the Insure New Mexico! Council, chair of the Health Care for New Mexicans Council, and co-chair of the New Mexico Commission for Community Volunteerism.

2010 New Mexico gubernatorial bid

Denish began preparing for her gubernatorial bid early and in 2007 had already amassed a war chest of over $1 million. She ran unopposed in the Democratic primary and was the Democratic nominee for Governor of New Mexico.

Denish was defeated in the general election on November 2, 2010 by Doña Ana County District Attorney Susana Martinez, who became New Mexico's first elected female governor, and as well as the first elected Hispanic woman to become governor in U.S. history.
The Denish vs. Martinez race and the simultaneous Jari Askins vs. Mary Fallin race in Oklahoma were only the third and fourth cases of woman vs. woman gubernatorial races in U.S. history. The other two cases being the 1986 Nebraska Gubernatorial Election between Kay Orr and Helen Boosalis, and the 2002 Hawaii Gubernatorial Election between Linda Lingle and Mazie Hirono

Awards
Denish has received the PNM Entrepreneur Advocate of the Year Award (2006), the Leadership New Mexico Distinguished Alumnus Award (2006), the Reverend Martin Luther King, Jr., Community Service Award (2005), the Albuquerque Chamber of Commerce Excellence in Education Award (2005), the WIPP Women Impacting Public Policy New Mexico Legislative Leadership Award (2004), the Hispanic Women’s Council Las Primeras Award, and the National Child Health Advocate Award (2005).

See also
List of female lieutenant governors in the United States

References

External links
New Mexico Office of the Lieutenant Governor Diane Denish official state site
Diane Denish for Governor official campaign site

|-

 

1949 births
Lieutenant Governors of New Mexico
Living people
New Mexico Democrats
New Mexico Institute of Mining and Technology
People from Hobbs, New Mexico
State political party chairs of New Mexico
University of New Mexico alumni
2000 United States presidential electors
Women in New Mexico politics
21st-century American women politicians